is a theme park at the Tokyo Disney Resort located in Urayasu, Chiba Prefecture, Japan, just next to Tokyo. It opened on 4 September 2001, at a cost of 335 billion yen. The Oriental Land Company owns the park, and licenses intellectual property from The Walt Disney Company. As of 2019, Tokyo DisneySea is the fourth-most visited theme park in the world and the second-most visited in Japan behind its sister park Tokyo Disneyland.

History
Plans for a second Disney park in Tokyo were first conceived in 1987. Initially, these plans included a park similar to Disney's Hollywood Studios (then Disney-MGM Studios), to be called Disney Hollywood Studio Theme Park at Tokyo Disneyland. This idea was later scrapped in 1992. During the creation of the park, the Walt Disney Company and the Oriental Land Company had to compromise on certain design elements of the park due to cultural differences, such as the park's entrance focal point. Ground was broken on October 22, 1998 and the park opened on September 4, 2001. Upon opening, Tokyo DisneySea became the ninth park of the twelve worldwide Disney theme parks to open. It has an overall nautical exploration theme. The idea for the park can be traced to a proposal to build a second theme park in Southern California called "Port Disney" in Long Beach, California, with the RMS Queen Mary as the main attraction. The idea was scrapped after Disney endured financial trouble with the Euro Disney project. Later the idea was passed on to the Oriental Land Company to expand their resort.

In 2002 Tokyo DisneySea won a Thea Award from the Themed Entertainment Association for the concept, design, and construction of the theme park. The award was presented at El Capitan Theater in Hollywood, California.

Temporary closures 
In October 2019, both Tokyo Disneyland and DisneySea were temporarily closed due to the threat of Typhoon Hagibis.

On 28 February 2020, Disney announced a temporary closure of Tokyo Disneyland and DisneySea from 29 February to combat the COVID-19 pandemic. The closure, originally slated to expire in mid-March, was later extended twice, with the latest extension being until 1 July 2020.

Attendance
Tokyo DisneySea reached the milestone of 10 million guests in 307 days since its grand opening, which is a record among theme parks worldwide. The previous record-holder was Universal Studios Japan, 338 days after its opening.

Park layout and attractions
There are currently seven themed lands, or "ports of call". The entrance to the park is Mediterranean Harbor, which opens up to six more nautically themed ports: American Waterfront, Lost River Delta, Port Discovery, Mermaid Lagoon, Arabian Coast, and Mysterious Island.

Mediterranean Harbor

Mediterranean Harbor is the entrance "port-of-call" and themed as an Italian port city, with Venetian Gondolas that guests can board and ride. Littered throughout the port are various shops and restaurants. Mediterranean Harbor's layout differs from the entry "lands" of other Disney parks as it is a large "V" shape rather than a main street that leads to a hub (as found in Disneyland's Main Street, U.S.A. or Disney's Hollywood Studios' Hollywood Boulevard). To the right, the path leads to Mysterious Island, and to the left, the path leads to the American Waterfront. Built into the architecture of the port is Tokyo DisneySea Hotel MiraCosta; the hotel serves as a full-scale reproduction of the various buildings of Portofino and Venice's ports and serves as the southern berm (or border) of the park. The design choice of combining a real hotel within the themed park areas helps to further the illusion that (as either a park or hotel guest) you are in an actual city; since the hotel is a functional building (rather than a 'set facade' -- the general standard in theme park designs) the effect of onlooking hotel guests, that may observe the park from hotel's rooms, balconies, and terraces serve in adding a level of kinetic authenticity in passing for an authentic Italian villa for park visitors, while the hotel guest enjoys the harborside views and novelty of location. Mediterranean Harbor also features Soaring: Fantastic Flight, a flying simulator, and Fortress Explorations, a large-scale interactive play area for guests that features exploration-themed activities and attractions.

Mysterious Island

Mysterious Island is a "port-of-call" within Mount Prometheus, the giant volcano known as park's centerpiece and most prominent feature. It relies heavily on the storytelling of Jules Verne and, specifically, the mythology of the volcano fortress mentioned several times in the books called "Vulcania". The Mount Prometheus ride employs technology similar to Epcot's Test Track. The smallest "port of call", it nevertheless holds two of the more popular attractions: Journey to the Center of the Earth, a thrill ride, and 20,000 Leagues Under the Sea, a dark ride. Despite its name, Mysterious Island is not an island; it is built into the side of Mount Prometheus, which is part of the show building for the two attractions. The architecture in this port is of Victorian style.

Mermaid Lagoon

Mermaid Lagoon is home to the characters of The Little Mermaid. The facade is made to resemble King Triton's palace and features seashell-inspired architecture. This "port of call" is mostly indoors and illuminated with cool, dim lighting to recreate the feeling of being underwater.  Attractions include Flounder's Flying Fish Coaster; Scuttle's Scooters; Jumpin' Jellyfish; Blowfish Balloon Race; The Whirlpool; all of which are children's rides. Also in this area are Ariel's Playground, which is a children's playground and extensive walk-through attraction that recreates the various settings in the movie; and the Mermaid Lagoon Theater, which formerly houses King Triton's Concert, a musical show featuring live actors, large-scale puppetry and Audio-Animatronics that recreate the story of The Little Mermaid.

Arabian Coast

Themed after Aladdin, this area is inspired by an Arabian harbor and the "enchanted world from 1001 Arabian Nights". There are five attractions in the land: Sindbad's Storybook Voyage, an indoor dark ride boat ride whose art direction seems to be (at first glance) a variation on "It's a Small World" (with its own theme song, "Compass of your Heart", composed by Alan Menken); Caravan Carousel, a double-decker carousel that holds over 190 passengers; Jasmine's Flying Carpets; and the Magic Lamp Theater, which houses a combined live-action/animatronic based magic show with a 3D movie featuring the Genie.

Lost River Delta

Located at the rear of the park, the dominant structure in this "port of call" is the ruins of an ancient Aztec pyramid which houses the dark thrill ride, Indiana Jones Adventure: Temple of the Crystal Skull. Also in the Lost River Delta is the DisneySea Steamer Line which transports guests back to Mediterranean Harbor, Out of Shadowland, a live theatrical show that follows Mei, a young girl lost in a world of shadows who finds confidence and strength through her sojourn there. Furthermore, the Lost River Delta contains an Intamin roller coaster named Raging Spirits, which opened in 2005 and is similar to Indiana Jones et le Temple du Péril at Disneyland Park in Paris.

Port Discovery

This "port of call" is home to the fictional 'Marine Life Institute' and is themed in retrofuturistic style; Port Discovery houses two attractions: Aquatopia, a boat ride that uses LPS tracking (the 'trackless' technology also used in Tokyo Disneyland's Pooh's Hunny Hunt) to move and spin through a lagoon amid waterfalls and whirlpools, and the  narrow gauge DisneySea Electric Railway, an overhead electric trolley that transports riders to and from the American Waterfront. On 12 May 2017, the land became home to Nemo & Friends SeaRider based on Finding Nemo/Finding Dory which replaced the former StormRider simulator.

American Waterfront

This "port of call" represents the northeastern seaboard of the United States in the early 20th century. It features two themed areas, an "Old Cape Cod" section, and a "New York Harbor" section. The land is dominated by a large passenger ship, SS Columbia, which is usually the site for various shows and events. Guests have the option of riding the area's "Big City Vehicles" which roam the streets of the area. It also features the  gauge DisneySea Electric Railway, which takes passengers from The American Waterfront to nearby Port Discovery. The port has a Broadway-themed theater which plays the show "Big Band Beat", which features 1940s-style swing jazz performed by a 12-piece band, as well as 20 singers/dancers. The port's most popular attraction is the Tower of Terror, an elaborately themed free-fall E-ticket ride.

Toy Story Mania is an interactive 4-D theme park attraction located at the American Waterfront in a new area called Toyville Trolley Park. It is inspired by Disney Pixar's Toy Story. The attraction opened on 9 July 2012. Guests wear 3-D glasses while riding spinning vehicles that travel through virtual environments based on classic carnival games. There are shooters on the vehicles to let guests to shoot targets in those 3-D games like "egg toss" and "balloon pop".

Fantasy Springs (Future) 

Announced in June 2018, an eighth "port of call" named Fantasy Springs will be added to the park as part of its largest expansion so far. It will comprise three areas themed to the films of Frozen, Tangled, and Peter Pan. There will be a total of four new attractions, three restaurants, and a new luxury hotel situated in the park itself. The entire area will be connected to the existing park through a pathway between the ports of Lost River Delta and Arabian Coast.

Originally scheduled to be completed by the fiscal year of 2022, its opening date has been pushed back to the fiscal year of 2023 after further studies and reviews.

See also

List of Tokyo DisneySea attractions
Rail transport in Walt Disney Parks and Resorts

References

External links
 Tokyo DisneySea official website

 
2001 establishments in Japan
Walt Disney Parks and Resorts
Amusement parks in Japan
Tourist attractions in Chiba Prefecture
Amusement parks opened in 2001